YUKA, formally  and formerly Yuka Sato (佐藤有香 Satō Yuka), is a Japanese singer, born on December 10, 1970. She is best known for her work in Japanese animation, including the ending themes of several Dragon Ball Z theatrical films (with Hironobu Kageyama), as well as singing "Mirai no Kioku", the opening theme of the series Kiddy Grade. In June 2000, she married drummer , and in 2003, gave birth to a son. Previously, she had also assumed the stage name Asakura Miyū (麻倉未有) in addition to her other names. More recently, her songs "Destiny of the Desert" and "Shinkirō" (Mirage) also appeared in the anime Desert Punk as the opening and closing songs respectively.

Trivia
Her maiden name (Satō Yuka) is identical to that of a famous Japanese figure-skater.

External links
 YUKA's profile
 YUKA's website
 

1970 births
Living people
Japanese women pop singers
Musicians from Miyagi Prefecture
Anime musicians
21st-century Japanese singers
21st-century Japanese women singers